Owen Biddle may refer to:

 Owen Biddle (musician) (born 1977), American bass guitarist, record producer and songwriter
 Owen Biddle Sr. (1737–1799), American clockmaker and watchmaker
 Owen Biddle Jr. (1774–1806), American carpenter and builder